Agyrtes is a genus of primitive carrion beetles in the family Agyrtidae. There are at least four described species in Agyrtes.

Species
These four species belong to the genus Agyrtes:
 Agyrtes bicolor Laporte de Castelnau, 1840
 Agyrtes longulus (LeConte, 1859)
 Agyrtes primoticus Scudder, 1900
 Agyrtes similis Fall, 1937

References

Further reading

External links

 

Staphylinoidea
Articles created by Qbugbot
Taxa named by Josef Aloys Frölich